7 Faces of Dr. Lao is a 1964 American Metrocolor Western fantasy-comedy film directed by George Pal (his final directorial effort) and starring Tony Randall. The film, an adaptation of the 1935 novel The Circus of Dr. Lao by Charles G. Finney adapted for the screen by Charles Beaumont, details the visit of a magical circus to a small town in the southwestern United States and its effects on the townspeople.

Plot 
Dr. Lao rides a golden donkey (implied to be The Golden Ass of Apuleis) into the small town of Abalone, Arizona and visits Edward Cunningham's newspaper to place a large advertisement for his traveling circus, which will play for two nights only.

Though quiet, Abalone is not peaceful. Wealthy rancher Clinton Stark has inside information that a railroad is coming to town and plans to buy the entire town while the land is cheap. Stark arrives at the newspaper offices to confront Cunningham about a recent editorial in opposition to Stark's plan. Lao, waiting to place his ad, silently listens to the meeting.

Another of Stark's opponents is Angela Benedict, a widow librarian and schoolteacher. Cunningham displays affection for her, embarrassing her in a visit to the library to research Lao's background, but she suppresses her reciprocal feelings.

At a town hall meeting, Stark announces that the town's 16-mile-long water-supply pipe is decaying and that a replacement would be prohibitively expensive. He offers to buy the entire town. Arguing against the offer, Cunningham introduces George G. George, a Navajo Indian who lives nearby in a town whose residents depend on Abalone's existence. Stark reluctantly allows the townspeople to ponder their choice until the next Friday night.

The next day, Cunningham confronts Lao at the circus site, arguing that Lao's hometown vanished centuries earlier. The mysterious Lao deflects Cunningham's questions. Later, Angela's young son Mike learns that Lao is 7,321 years old. When the circus opens, Lao uses his many faces to offer his wisdom, including those of Pan (the god of joy), the Great Serpent, Medusa and the magician Merlin.

Mike visits Lao seeking a job, displaying his novice juggling and conjuring skills. Lao instead offers observations in the form of a poetic speech about the world, and life, as a circus.

It is learned that on the first night of the circus, Stark's henchmen destroyed the newspaper office. Angela is kept awake that night, plagued by the music that Pan played while nobody else can hear it.

At dawn, the newspapermen are astonished to discover that their office has been fully restored with the press operating. Attributing it to Lao, they rush to produce a short edition of the paper, which Cunningham delivers to Stark in the morning. When he visits the circus site, Lao offers encouragement and calls on Cunningham to keep faith.

That evening, Lao stages his grand finale, a magic lantern show depicting the story of a once-happy kingdom of Woldercan, destroyed by the pettiness and greed of its inhabitants. The Abalone townspeople are at first delighted to see themselves represented in the vision, then chastened as it progresses toward the end of the mythical civilization in explosions and darkness. The townspeople find themselves again in the library in a town meeting. A vote is called on Stark's proposal, and to the surprise of Cunningham, Benedict and Stark, it is rejected unanimously. Stark tells everyone about the coming railroad and Angela confesses her love to Cunningham.

Stark's henchmen are confused by their his apparent change of character and trash Lao's circus in a drunken spree, during which they break Dr. Lao's fishbowl. The fish inside it is revealed to be the Loch Ness Monster, which balloons to enormous size when exposed to the open air. After it chases the two thugs away, Dr. Lao conjures rain to wet the monster and shrink it to its original size.

Morning comes and the circus is gone, with only a red circle on the desert floor where the tent had been. At first Mike's reports of the previous night are disbelieved, but Stark finds the hat belonging to one of the henchmen. Mike chases a dust plume that seems to him to be the spirit of Dr. Lao. However, Mike finds only three wooden balls, which he juggles while summoning the spirit of Lao to observe.

Dr. Lao rides away as his advice from two nights earlier is repeated, reminding Mike that the circus of Dr. Lao is life itself, and that everything within it is a wonder.

Cast
 Tony Randall as Dr. Lao, the Mysterious Visitor
 as Merlin, the Great Magician
 as Pan, the God of Joy
 as the Serpent
 as Medusa, the Fabled Monster
 as Apollonius of Tyana, the blind fortune teller
 as the Abominable Snowman
 Arthur O'Connell as Clint Stark, the Ruthless Tycoon
 John Ericson as Ed Cunningham, the Crusading Publisher and the Transformed Pan
 Barbara Eden as Angela Benedict, the Widowed Librarian
 Kevin Tate as Mike Benedict, Angela's son
 Noah Beery, Jr. as Sam, the Loyal Pressman
 Royal Dano as Casey, the Brutal Henchman
 John Doucette as Lucas, the Henchman's Sidekick
 Lee Patrick as Mrs. Howard T. Cassan, the Stuffy Matron
 Minerva Urecal as Kate Lindquist, the Shrewish Wife
 John Qualen as Luther Lindquist, the Meek Husband
 Frank Cady as Mayor James Sargent
 Eddie Little Sky as George G. George, the Friendly Indian
 Frank Kreig as Peter Ramsey, the Jolly Townsman
 Peggy Rea as Bunny (Mrs. Peter) Ramsey, the Jolly Wife 
 Argentina Brunetti as Sarah Benedict, Angela's loving Mother-in Law
 Dallas McKennon as Lean Cowboy
 Chubby Johnson as Fat Cowboy
 Douglas Fowley as Toothless Cowboy
 Bess Flowers as Spectator at Medusa Presentation (uncredited)
 George J. Lewis as Mr. Frisco (uncredited)

Randall voices the Serpent, a stop-motion animated snake with the face of O'Connell. While Randall is also credited as the Abominable Snowman, bodybuilder Péter Pál (son of the film's director) was the uncredited body double. Randall also appears with his own face as a silent audience member.

Production 
The original novel was published in 1934. Film rights were bought by George Pal, who in April 1961 said that Charles Beaumont was writing a script. "He has a kooky mind like mine," said Pal.

In September 1961, Pal said that Laurence Harvey would star. In December 1961, Terry-Thomas was linked to the project. In June 1962, Metro-Goldwyn-Mayer announced that Rod Taylor would star in the film.

According to notes on the Leigh Harline soundtrack CD released by Film Score Monthly, Pal's first choice for the role of Dr. Lao was Peter Sellers, who was strongly interested. However, MGM had Tony Randall under contract and wanted to use him, as he was $50,000 cheaper. In June 1963, it was announced that Randall would play the lead.

Filming began on July 15, 1963.

The "Woldercan spectacular" that Dr. Lao presents as the grand finale of his circus contains much footage from an earlier George Pal production, 1961's Atlantis, the Lost Continent, as well as some footage of flowing lava from The Time Machine and stock footage of destruction from MGM's 1951 production of Quo Vadis. The crystal ball and large hourglass used by the Wicked Witch of the West in 1939's The Wizard of Oz can be seen in the film. In the scene in which Mike visits Lao at night, a two-headed tortoise can be seen that would later appear in several episodes of The Addams Family.

Reception 
7 Faces of Dr. Lao garnered positive reception from multiple movie critics. Rotten Tomatoes, a review aggregator, reports that five of six surveyed critics gave the film a positive review; the average rating is 83%. Howard Thompson of The New York Times called the film "heavy, thick, pint-sized fantasy, laid on with an anvil."

Box office
In 1974, Pal said 7 Faces of Dr. Lao was the only of his films to lose money at the box office, although it had since recouped its cost through television broadcast rights.

Awards
William Tuttle received an honorary Academy Award for his makeup work. It was the first of only two honorary Oscars awarded for makeup; the other went to John Chambers in 1968 for Planet of the Apes. Randall's head was shaved, not only to play the bald Dr. Lao but also to facilitate the many costume and makeup changes.

Jim Danforth's model animation of the Loch Ness Monster, the Giant Serpent and Medusa's snake hair were nominated for an Academy Award.

Aftermath
In January, 1965 MGM announced that Randall would return as Dr. Lao in a sequel, but it did not materialize.

Home media 
7 Faces of Dr. Lao was originally released on a two-sided Region 1 DVD in 2000. It was subsequently rereleased as a region-free DVD as part of the Warner Bros. Archive Collection in November 2011.

See also 
 Pan in popular culture

References

External links

 
 
 
 

1960s English-language films
1960s fantasy comedy films
1964 Western (genre) films
1964 comedy films
1964 films
American fantasy comedy films
American Western (genre) fantasy films
Circus films
Films based on American novels
Films based on fantasy novels
Films directed by George Pal
Films produced by George Pal
Films scored by Leigh Harline
Films set in Arizona
Films that won the Academy Award for Best Makeup
Films using stop-motion animation
Films with screenplays by Charles Beaumont
Metro-Goldwyn-Mayer films
1960s American films